Johann Baptist Isidor Richter, or János Richter (4 April 1843 – 5 December 1916) was an Austrian–Hungarian orchestral and operatic conductor.

Biography
Richter was born in Raab (Hungarian: Győr), Kingdom of Hungary, Austrian Empire. His father was a local composer, conductor and regens chori Anton Richter. His mother was opera-singer Jozefa Csazenszky. He studied at the Vienna Conservatory.  He had a particular interest in the horn, and developed his conducting career at several different opera houses in the Austro-Hungarian Empire. He became associated with Richard Wagner in the 1860s, and played the solo trumpet part in the 1870 private premiere of the Siegfried Idyll. In 1876, he was chosen to conduct the first complete performance of Wagner's Der Ring des Nibelungen at the Bayreuth Festspielhaus.

In 1877, he assisted the ailing composer as conductor of a major series of Wagner concerts in London, and from then onwards he became a familiar feature of English musical life, appearing at many choral festivals including as principal conductor of the Birmingham Triennial Music Festival (1885–1909) and directing the Hallé Orchestra (1899–1911) and the newly formed London Symphony Orchestra (1904–1911).  In Europe his work was chiefly based in Vienna, where (transcending the bitter division between the followers of Wagner and those of Johannes Brahms) he gave much attention to the works of Brahms himself, Anton Bruckner (who once slipped a coin into his hand after a concert by way of a tip) and Antonín Dvořák (he gave the London and Vienna premieres of the Symphonic Variations); he also continued to work at Bayreuth.

In later years, Richter became a fervent admirer and advocate of Sir Edward Elgar and he came to accept Pyotr Ilyich Tchaikovsky. On one occasion, he laid down his baton and allowed a London orchestra to play the whole second movement of Tchaikovsky's Pathétique Symphony itself.  Never afraid to experiment on behalf of the music he loved, he lent his authority to an English-language production of The Ring at Covent Garden (January and February 1909).  In 1909 he delivered the British premiere, very shortly after the world premiere, in Boston, of Ignacy Jan Paderewski's Symphony in B minor "Polonia".  Failing eyesight forced his retirement in 1911. He died at Bayreuth in 1916.

Richter's approach to conducting was monumental rather than mercurial or dynamic, emphasising the overall structure of major works in preference to bringing out individual moments of beauty or passion. Some observers regarded him as little more than a time-beater; but others, notably Eugene Goossens, pointed to the remarkable rhythmic vitality of his work, a quality which hardly squares with the image of Richter as a rather stolid and static personality. 

A rebuke he is supposed to have made to a musician in the Covent Garden orchestra is still sometimes quoted:

"Up with your damned nonsense will I put twice, or perhaps once, but sometimes always, by God, never."

Notable premieres
 Wagner: Siegfried (1876)
 Wagner: Götterdämmerung (1876)
 Brahms: Symphony No. 2 (1877)
 Brahms: Tragic Overture (1880)
 Brahms: Piano Concerto No. 2 (1881; composer, soloist)
 Tchaikovsky: Violin Concerto in D (1881; Adolph Brodsky, soloist)
 Bruckner: Symphony No. 4 (1881)
 Brahms: Symphony No. 3 (1883)
 Bruckner: Te Deum (1885)
 Bruckner: Symphony No. 8 (1892)
 Elgar: Enigma Variations (1899)
 Elgar: The Dream of Gerontius (1900)
 Elgar: Symphony No. 1 (1908)

Notes

References

Further reading

 Christopher Fifield.  Foreword by Georg Solti.  True Artist and True Friend: A Biography of Hans Richter.   Oxford University Press, 1993.  . (The title is from Elgar's dedication of his Symphony No. 1.)

1843 births
1916 deaths
Male conductors (music)
Swedish conductors (music)
Hungarian conductors (music)
Hungarian male musicians
Honorary Members of the Royal Philharmonic Society
London Symphony Orchestra principal conductors
19th-century conductors (music)
20th-century Austrian conductors (music)
20th-century Austrian male musicians
20th-century Swedish male musicians
People from Győr